Law Abiding Citizen is the soundtrack to the film of the same name by F. Gary Gray. The score was composed by Brian Tyler. It was released on Downtown Soundtracks, a division of Downtown Music LLC, on October 13, 2009.

The score features a 52-piece ensemble of the Hollywood Studio Symphony.

Track listing

References

2009 soundtrack albums
Brian Tyler soundtracks
Downtown Records albums
Thriller film soundtracks